The 1989 Cork Senior Football Championship was the 101st staging of the Cork Senior Football Championship since its establishment by the Cork County Board in 1887. The draw for the opening round fixtures took place on 18 December 1988. The championship began on 16 April 1989 and ended on 29 October 1989.

Nemo Rangers entered the championship as the defending champions, however, they were defeated by St. Finbarr's in a semi-final replay.

On 29 October 1989, Castlehaven won the championship following a 0-09 to 0-07 defeat of St. Finbarr's in the final. This was their first championship title.

Eoin O'Mahony from the Nemo Rangers club was the championship's top scorer with 2-14.

Team changes

To Championship

Promoted from the Cork Intermediate Football Championship
 Kilshannig

From Championship

Regraded to the Cork Intermediate Football Championship
 Castletownbere
 Midleton
 Millstreet

Results

First round

Second round

Quarter-finals

Semi-finals

Final

Championship statistics

Top scorers

Top scorers overall

Top scorers in a single game

Miscellaneous

 Castlehaven win their first senior title.

References

Cork Senior Football Championship